Mill Creek is a stream in Washington and St. Francois counties of eastern Missouri. It is a tributary of the Big River. The stream source is located at:  near Mineral Point and the confluence with Big River is at:  just south of Blackwell.

See also
List of rivers of Missouri

References

Rivers of St. Francois County, Missouri
Rivers of Washington County, Missouri
Rivers of Missouri